Harry Hanslap (also Hanslope) (d. 1452) was a Canon of Windsor from 1437 to 1452.

Career

He was appointed:
Prebendary of Darlington 1440
Prebendary of Skipworth in Howden
Prebendary of Stow Longa in Lincoln 1448 – 1452
Rector of Middleton Cheney, Northamptonshire until 1452
 
He was appointed to the eleventh stall in St George's Chapel, Windsor Castle in 1437 and held the canonry until 1452.

On the death of Sigismund, Holy Roman Emperor in 1437 his sword of 1416 was given to him by the Dean, and Hanslap gave this to the Mayor of York. It is now York's great sword of state and currently displayed in the Mansion House, York.

Notes 

1452 deaths
Canons of Windsor
Year of birth unknown